James Wootton may refer to:
 James Wootton (footballer), English footballer
 James Wootton (animator), Canadian animator
 Jimmy Wootton, English cricketer

See also
 James Wootton-Davies, British member of parliament